Carreras is   a small town located in the Mexican state of Durango. The town is part of Tepehuanes Municipality. Carreras has a small population of mostly retired people, with tourism  during the summer and the winter. Tourists mostly consist of the children of migrant parents from the United States mostly from California, Nevada, Illinois, Texas, Georgia and Virginia. Children usually ride ATV's around the towns dirt roads but recently the roads were paved. Occasionally, the town hosts various "Coleaderas" (rodeos) in the town's "Lienzo charro".

Populated places in Durango